In enzymology, a galactosylgalactosylglucosylceramidase is an enzyme that catalyzes the chemical reaction

D-galactosyl-D-galactosyl-D-glucosyl-N-acylsphingosine + H2O  D-galactose + lactosyl-N-acylsphingosine

Thus, the two substrates of this enzyme are D-galactosyl-D-galactosyl-D-glucosyl-N-acylsphingosine and H2O, whereas its two products are D-galactose and lactosyl-N-acylsphingosine.

This enzyme belongs to the family of hydrolases, specifically those glycosidases that hydrolyse O- and S-glycosyl compounds.  The systematic name of this enzyme class is D-galactosyl-D-galactosyl-D-glucosyl-N-acylsphingosine galactohydrolase. Other names in common use include trihexosyl ceramide galactosidase, ceramide trihexosidase, ceramidetrihexoside alpha-galactosidase, trihexosylceramide alpha-galactosidase, and ceramidetrihexosidase.

References

 

EC 3.2.1
Enzymes of unknown structure